HYS or HyS may refer to:

 Hayes railway station (station code: HYS), a railway station located in Hayes in the London Borough of Bromley
 Hays Regional Airport (IATA code: HYS), a general-aviation airport in Ellis County, Kansas
 Heep Yunn School, an Anglican girls' secondary school
 Hybrid sulfur cycle (HyS), a two-step water-splitting process
 HYS The Hague, the ice hockey club in The Hague, Netherlands